Ladies Benevolent Society (LBS) was a charitable organization for women, active in the city of Charleston, South Carolina between 1813 and 1861.

The LBS was founded in 1813. It was founded by white, elite women of Charleston. The initial purpose was to provide help to the needing after the War of 1812, but in contrast to its predecessors, it was to become the first permanent charitable organisation by women in Charleston.

LBS conducted charity among the poor in Charleston, founded upon the ideal of Christian charity. The foremost focus of the LBS was poor white women, although they are known to have occasionally helped free coloured women as well. LBS aimed to offer care for "anyone who did not fall within the purview of the almshouse, dispensary, or slave hospital.” The ladies cared for Blacks if they were freed and did not ask for information about how that freedom was obtained in the name of "southern tradition". The ladies would visit the ill and provide them with sugar, coffee, blankets, soaps, among other comforts. It played an important role in the life of the pre-war city. In Antebellum Charleston, there were few occupations available for uneducated poor women who needed to support themselves. Normally in the 19th-century, this category of women would be working as domestic servants, but in the Antebellum South, the planter aristocracy owned enslaved people and did not employ free domestic maids, and consequently, poor uneducated white women were, to a large degree, dependent upon charity.

The LBS played a pioneering role as one of the first public organisations in Antebellum South Carolina which was managed by women. In Antebellum South, where women's public participation in society was controversial, LBS was an important organisation founded and managed by women which played an active part in society and managed its own independent finances. It was the local version of a number of local organisations of the same kind, also called "Ladies Benevolent Society", which was founded around the United States at that time. It was the first of the three leading women's organisations in Antebellum Charleston, the other being Ladies Fuel Society (LFS) from 1830 and Female Charitable Association (FCA) from 1824.

The Ladies Benevolent Society provided an estimated 10% of charity proceeds in Charleston at the time. With the rise of other charitable groups such as the Sisters of Charity of Our Lady of Mercy and the Methodist Benevolent Society during the mid-19th century, the Ladies Benevolent Society’s workload diminished.

LBS was disbanded after the outbreak of the American Civil War in 1861.

References 

 Cynthia M. Kennedy:   Braided Relations, Entwined Lives: The Women of Charleston's Urban Slave Society
 Walter B. Edgar: South Carolina: A History
 http://www.scencyclopedia.org/sce/entries/female-benevolent-societies/

19th-century in Charleston, South Carolina
Women's organizations based in the United States
1813 in South Carolina
1813 establishments in the United States
History of women in South Carolina